This is a list of fossiliferous stratigraphic units in Prince Edward Island, Canada.

References

 

Prince Edward Island
Geology of Prince Edward Island